Tucson Unified School District (TUSD) is the largest school district of Tucson, Arizona, in terms of enrollment. Dr. Gabriel Trujillo is the superintendent, appointed on September 12, 2017 by the Governing Board.  As of 2016, TUSD had more than 47,670 students. As of Fall 2012, according to Superintendent John Pedicone (on the 9/14/2012 Buckmaster Show), TUSD had 50,000 students. District enrollment has declined over the last 10 years and TUSD lost 1,700 to 2,000 students per year for the two or three years prior to 2012.

Area
The district boundaries encompass Tucson, South Tucson, Drexel Heights, and Valencia West. Parts of Tucson Estates, Catalina Foothills and Tanque Verde are also within the district, as well as a few unincorporated parts of Pima County that do not fall within the confines of a Census Designated Place.  TUSD is currently under a federal desegregation order to help balance district schools in terms of race and ethnicity.  The district was established as "Pima County School District No. 1" in 1867, centered approximately at the latitude 32°13'15.57"N and the longitude 110°58'23.70"W (a monument now known as La Placita), and assumed its current name in 1977.

Controversy

Ethnic Studies Ban
In 2012, in response to state law HB2281, the district put into storage, or distributed to the district libraries, several books used in a course that were determined to be against state law A.R.S. 15-112, including the textbook Rethinking Columbus and the Tempest.
Books were taken away while students were in class.
The dismantling of the Mexican-American studies departments and similar Mexican cultural courses has caused controversy regarding the ideas of xenophobia and racism against Mexican-American students and their heritage. However, studies demonstrated that students enrolled in these programs had higher rates of graduation and attendance.

The TUSD board meetings, in response to the proposed bill HB2281, resulted in several students and faculty who demonstrated against the legislation being arrested and/or injured. Due to the impending loss of state funding should the TUSD continue the program, the board ruled in a 4-1 decision in January 2012 to ban the program.
On January 13, 2012, students walked out of class and held a protest against the banishment of the Mexican-American Studies program.

The Daily Show aired a satirical piece on April 2, 2012, concerning the banning of Mexican-American studies as voted by the school board. Michael Hicks, a voting member, said that he was concerned with the "revolutionary" aspect of the curriculum that encouraged students to take part in "bloodshed" against the "gringos." When asked if he had ever been to a class himself to support his claims, he answered that he had not visited the school but based his opinion on "hearsay from the others."

The TUSD Governing Board's resolution of this issue has been to establish a course to be taken by all students that emphasizes multiculturalism and diversity. The current program, much like the Mexican studies program, seeks to educate students on themes of identity. It is based on four pillars namely, "identity, diversity, justice and action." This program strives to "promote intercultural understanding and addresses the needs of students who have been historically marginalized or underrepresented." Some students and their parents sued the school board and government, claiming that the TUSD ban of the Mexican American studies program violated their rights under the First and 14th amendments. In August 2017, A. Wallace Tashima, a federal judge, ruled that  the students and parents had had their rights violated on both counts. A US judge in 2017 also blocked an ethnic studies ban because he found the ban to be racially motivated.

For program specifics, please refer to: Mexican American Studies Department Programs, Tucson Unified School District

"Black List"
In May 2017 the long-rumored "black list" of employees blocked from future hire was discovered, first created in August 2012.  Despite the TUSD's stated hiring policies, in January 2018, it was discovered that the list spanned 20 years and 1,400 entries, with about 900 of those former employees claiming that they were blacklisted wrongfully and without notice, for unfirable items such as "personality clashes" with superiors, poor evaluation scores, or using all their vacation time. Only 516 of those listings were clearly justified. The list spanned 1,400 entries and went back 20 years.

Language Education
TUSD came under fire for cuts to the high school graduation requirements made in the year 2008— in years prior, senior high school students at TUSD were required to obtain at least two years of foreign language education in order to receive their high school diploma. In 2008, the TUSD School board approved to revoke the mandate that required the two years of foreign language education for each graduating student, citing budget cuts as the overarching problem.  The prominent Tucson newspaper, the Arizona Daily Star, later printed an editorial addressing the new requirement, agreeing that they would rather see the budget cuts being made in the language department than in others, and stating that TUSD and the School Board did the reasonable thing under the situation. Others disagreed with the mandate, expressing their concern on the fact that most public and private universities, including Tucson's own University of Arizona, require at least two years of a high school foreign language class for admission.

Demographics
As of October 2018, the demographics of the district were composed of: 63.8% Hispanic (of any race, primarily Mexican American), 20.5% non-Hispanic Whites, 6.0% Black, 3.6% Native American, 2.1% Asian, and 3.9% Multi-racial.

Schools

Traditional high schools (9)

Magnet program*

The largest high school in the district, in terms of enrollment, is Tucson High Magnet School near downtown Tucson.  According to the district website, 2945 students attended Tucson High during the 2006–2007 school year.  It is also the oldest high school in the district.  Tucson High School was built in 1907 across the street from where it now stands.  The school relocated to its present site in 1923. In 1956, the school had the largest enrollment of any high school in the United States, over 6,800 pupils.  The original Tucson High building still exists as Roskruge Elementary and Bilingual Middle Magnet School. The TUSD also owns the radio station KWXL-LP .

Other high schools (7)

Traditional middle schools and K-8 schools

K-8 schools

Elementary schools

Other schools

Former schools
Congress Street School - It was the first facility in the Arizona Territory used for a school maintained with government funds, being established in 1875. In 1976 it reopened as a school for middle schoolers struggling with mainstream education.

Health Initiatives
The Tucson Unified School District has a number of policies that encourage a healthy lifestyle for its students and employees.  The District Wellness Program states that, “Schools shall implement a comprehensive, integrated program for these two components of a coordinated school health program: nutrition and physical activity”.  To meet United States Department of Agriculture nutrition requirements, many of the breakfast and lunch options the TUSD offers are whole grain, like whole wheat bread, whole wheat pasta and whole wheat hot dog and hamburger buns.  In addition, milk, fruits, and vegetables are always offered to students as sides.  The TUSD also requires that fundraising events that involve the sale of food meet the same health requirements that school lunches do, though special events such as sports are exempt.  Advertisements, such as those on the front of vending machines, must encourage students to purchase healthier options, like water; and other a la carte foods that do not meet health regulations can be offered on only an “infrequent basis."

The TUSD addresses other challenges by recognizing that students will make health decisions based largely on the influence of their role models, like their parents/guardians and teachers.  Therefore, the TUSD attempts to communicate with parents and guardians through a variety of channels about the benefits of a healthy lifestyle, and guardians are encouraged to pack lunches that meet USDA suggestions if their students do not purchase food from the school.  Newsletters published by the district also contain lists of foods that meet health regulations and would be popular for celebrations, such as birthday parties.  Furthermore, the district provides an Employee Wellness Committee, which provides health education to district employees, offers free physical activities for staff to partake in and opportunities for staff to monitor their own health and goals.  
	
To meet the physical activity aspect of the mission statement, the TUSD has partnered with the National Association for Sport and Physical Education (NASPE) to provide standards regarding physical education and recess for younger grades.  The NASPE provides physical education teachers with appropriate time ranges that students should be active for, the number of times per week students should participate in physical activity, and suggestions to make physical education more individualized.  The TUSD also requires that schools have opportunities for students to be physically active before, during and after school, which incorporates recess, varsity and intramural sports, and open gyms and tracks.  As with school lunches, the district also encourages parents and guardians to be physically active with their children and to encourage an overall healthy lifestyle.

The TUSD also supports health initiatives made by individual schools.  For example, Sam Hughes Elementary School has a community garden and offers culinary classes to its students as part of Michelle Obama's Let's Move! campaign.  The "Greening Group" at the school maintains the garden and is funded by the school's Parent Teacher Association.

References

External links 

 
 Radio station owned by TUSD
"MAS students speak out against TUSD banning their books and classes", The Tucson Citizen, DA Morales, January 15, 2012

School districts in Pima County, Arizona
Unified School District
1867 establishments in Arizona Territory
School districts established in 1867